Princess Stella Sigcau (4 or 14 January 1937 in Lusikisiki – 7 May 2006 in Durban) was a Minister in the South African Government. Sigcau was also the first female Prime Minister of the bantustan of Transkei before being deposed in a military coup in 1987.

Early life and career
She was the daughter of King Botha Sigcau of the AmaMpondo state who was a former President of the Transkei in 1976–1978. Her brothers are King Mpondombini Thandizulu Sigcau and the late ANC activist and Member of Parliament Nkosi Ntsikayezwe Sigcau. She named Nkosi Ntsikayezwe Sigcau's daughter Princess Stella Sigcau II (Founder: Lwandlolubomvu Rural Development Project) after her. Sigcau graduated from the Loveday Institute in 1954 before marrying Ronald Tshabalala in 1962.

She went on to attend the University of Fort Hare. There she joined the African National Congress Youth League (ANCYL), then graduating with a BA degree majoring in Anthropology and Psychology. She was married for a brief period, her husband Roland Tshabalala died in 1964. She taught in a number of schools in Natal during the 1960s.

Transkei politics
In 1968, she was elected in Transkei representing the seat of Lusikisiki. Prior to the granting of independence, she held a number of portfolios, including energy, education and telecommunications. She was the only woman in the Transkei's cabinet. Sigcau had a frosty relationship with Prime Minister Kaiser Matanzima. Her political ideologies and associations with the ANC Youth League in Fort Hare where in direct opposition to Matanzima's. This she believed was the reason why she found it difficult to secure a post as a teacher in the Eastern Cape, as a result she taught in a number of schools in Natal during the 1960s. Even though Sigcau was a part of the Transkei administration, she still maintained links with the ANC, who were operating from Lusaka at the time. Her father Botha Sigcau was king of the Mpondo people, who had influence within the Transkei State. A battle for power ensued between the Mpondo chieftaincy and Matanzima's Transkei government. In 1977 she gave birth to her third child after having an affair with Chief JD Moshesh, who was also a government official. Shortly thereafter her father Botha Sigcau died from a long illness. After King Sigcau's death Matanzima was looking to consolidate his authority over the Mpondo people, and he forced Sigcau out of office. Matanzima cited Sigcau and Chief JD Moshesh's affair as a breach of code of conduct for the reasons to recall her from public office. This was met with mixed reactions, given that she was also a widowed princess at the time. After the opening of parliament in 1978 Sigcau led a floor crossing of all Pondoland MPs, and formed the Democratic Progressive Party, but two years later she re-joined the Transkei National Independence Party, which was still the ruling party at the time.

After independence, she held the portfolios of Interior Affairs and Posts and Telecommunications. She became the leader of the Transkei National Independence Party on 5 October 1987 and became the third Prime Minister of Transkei two days later. Then Prime Minister and brother to Kaiser Matanzima, George Matanzima was forced to resign from office due to corruption allegations. She defeated Kholisilie Nota and Ngangomhlaba Matanzima to the position, both of whom were male.  
Her term as Prime Minister did not last long as she was overthrown in a coup by General Bantu Holomisa. This came after Holomisa accused her government of corruption, alleging that Sigcau received bribes in exchange for gambling rights. While she denied these allegations, she conceded to accepting a bursary worth R50 000 from an official in order to pay for her daughter's tuition.

South African politics
Transkei was absorbed back into South Africa after 27 April 1994. Sigcau stood for election as a candidate on the African National Congress party list and was successful. President Nelson Mandela appointed her as Minister for Public Enterprises in 1994 and she served in that role, which involved attempts at transforming the face of South African Airways and Transnet until 1999. She then became Minister of Public Works and served in that capacity until her death in 2006 of heart failure.

See also
 African National Congress 
 Transkei

External links

South African Cabinet biography of Stella Sigcau
The Australian "Anti-apartheid leader dies" 8 May 2006

References

1937 births
2006 deaths
Prime Ministers of Transkei
Female heads of government
Anti-apartheid activists
African National Congress politicians
Government ministers of South Africa
Members of the National Assembly of South Africa
Transkei National Independence Party politicians
People from the Eastern Cape
Xhosa people
Leaders ousted by a coup
Women government ministers of South Africa
20th-century South African women politicians
20th-century South African politicians
Women members of the National Assembly of South Africa